Brigadier-General Charles Mills "Bud" Drury,  (17 May 1912 – 12 January 1991) was a Canadian military officer, lawyer, civil servant, businessman and politician.

Early life and education
Born in Westmount, Quebec, he was the elder son of Victor Montague Drury (1884–1962), a prominent businessman who was the son of Major-General Charles William Drury (1856–1913) and the brother-in-law of Max Aitken, 1st Baron Beaverbrook. He was educated at Selwyn House School and Bishop's College School, and he later attended the Royal Military College of Canada, McGill University (B.C.L., 1936) and the University of Paris.

Career
Drury served in the Canadian Armed Forces from 1933 to 1936, then he practiced law from 1936 to 1939. During World War II, he was a Canadian Army officer and from March−July 1944 commanded the 4th Field Regiment of the Royal Canadian Artillery, part of the 2nd Canadian Infantry Division, which took part in Operation Overlord, before being made the 2nd Division's General Staff Officer Grade 1 (GSO1) and later becoming the Commander, Royal Artillery (CRA) of the 4th Canadian (Armoured) Division. He was promoted to the rank of Brigadier-General in 1945. After the war, he headed the United Nations Relief and Rehabilitation Administration mission in Poland from 1945 to 1947.

He then entered the Canadian civil service and was appointed as deputy minister of the Department of National Defence from 1949 to 1955. He spent 1955 to 1962 working on private family business before running for election to the House of Commons of Canada.

Drury was elected as a Liberal party Member of Parliament (MP) for the Montreal riding of Saint-Antoine—Westmount (later Westmount) in the 1962 federal election. He was re-elected in the 1963, 1965, 1968, 1972 and 1974 elections.

He held many ministerial positions in the governments of prime ministers Lester Pearson and Pierre Trudeau, including Defence Production, Industry, Trade and Commerce, Treasury Board, National Defence (acting), Public Works and Finance (acting).

After leaving politics in 1978, Drury became chairman of the National Capital Commission from 1978 to 1984. He was made an Officer of the Order of Canada in 1980.

Electoral record (partial)

References

External links

Charles Mills Drury at The Canadian Encyclopedia
Generals of World War II

|-

|-

|-

1912 births
1991 deaths
Canadian Ministers of Finance
Canadian Commanders of the Order of the British Empire
Canadian Companions of the Distinguished Service Order
Liberal Party of Canada MPs
Bishop's College School alumni
Members of the House of Commons of Canada from Quebec
Members of the King's Privy Council for Canada
McGill University alumni
Officers of the Order of Canada
Lawyers in Quebec
Royal Military College of Canada alumni
People from Westmount, Quebec
Anglophone Quebec people
Canadian Army personnel of World War II
Canadian generals
20th-century Canadian lawyers
Canadian military personnel from Quebec